Çatalan Dam is an embankment dam on the Seyhan River dam in Adana Province, Turkey. Constructed between 1982 and 1997, the development was backed by the Turkish State Hydraulic Works.

See also

Yedigöze Dam – upstream
Seyhan Dam – downstream
List of dams and reservoirs in Turkey

References

Dams in Adana Province
Hydroelectric power stations in Turkey
Dams completed in 1997
Dams on the Seyhan River